The CONCACAF U-17 Championship is an international association football event in the North America, Central America and the Caribbean region, and is the qualification tournament for the FIFA U-17 World Cup.

Results
In 2009 the tournament returned to a championship format in which all four semifinalists qualify to the FIFA U-17 World Cup. The 2009 tournament was cut short due to the swine flu outbreak in Mexico. No championship round was played as a result of the cancellation, and the tournament ended with four teams qualifying to the 2009 FIFA U-17 World Cup without determining a regional champion.
Until 1988 the tournament was held as an Under 16 edition.

Winners by country

Note: no titles or runners-up between 1999 and 2009.

Comprehensive team results by tournament
Legend:

 – Champions
 – Runners-up
 – Third Place
 – Fourth Place
 – Semi-finalists
QF – Quarter-finals
R2 – Round 2
R16 – Round of 16
GS – Group stage
Q – Qualified for upcoming tournament
 – First place Group A/Group B
 – Second place Group A/Group B
 – Third place Group A/Group B
 – Fourth place Group A/Group B
5B – Fifth place Group B
• – Playoff Winner
 ••  – Qualified but withdrew
 •  – Did not qualify
 ×  – Did not enter
 ×  – Withdrew / Banned / Entry not accepted by FIFA
 — Country not affiliated to CONCACAF at that time
 — Country did not exist or national team was inactive
     – Hosts
     – Not affiliated to FIFA

Men's U-17 World Cup Qualifiers
Legend
1st – Champions
2nd – Runners-up
3rd – Third place
4th – Fourth place
QF – Quarterfinals
R2 – Round 2
R1 – Round 1
     – Hosts
Q – Qualified for upcoming tournament

See also 
 CONCACAF Under-20 Championship
 FIFA U-17 World Cup
 CONCACAF Women's U-17 Championship
 CONCACAF

Notes and references

External links 
Official Site
Tournament at soccerway.com

 
Under-17 association football
Under
Recurring sporting events established in 1983